Charles Blondelet, full name Désiré Jacques François Blondelet, (4 November 1820  – 2 December 1888.) was a 19th-century French actor, playwright and chansonnier. He performed at the Théâtre des Variétés from 1858 to 1888.

Works 
1858: La-i-tou et Tralala in collaboration with Michel Bordet, folie-vaudeville in 1 act ; Dechaume
1859: Ah, il a des bottes, Bastien, vaudeville in 1 act ; Librairie Théâtrale
1859: Le diable au corps, féérie-vaudeville in 1 act ; Librairie Théâtrale
1868: Le beau Paris, in collaboration with Félix Baumaine, saynete-bouffe set in music by Léon Roques ; Egrot 
1868: Deux auteurs incompris, opérette bouffe in 1 act set in music by Félix Jouffroy ; Librairie Théâtrale 
1879: L'assommoir procédé d'une conférence sur l'Assommoir, ambiguë parodie in 1 act in collaboration with Félix Baumaine ; Le Bailly 
1883: Les Rois s'amusent, ou les Deux Henriot, operetta in 1 act set in music by Édouard Deransart ; Feuchot

Theatre 
1860: Oh ! là là ! qu' c'est bête tout ça ! de Clairville and Théodore Cogniard, Théâtre des Variétés
1861: L'Amour en sabots by Eugène Labiche and Alfred Delacour, Théâtre des Variétés
1865: L'Homme qui manque le coche by Eugène Labiche and Alfred Delacour, Théâtre des Variétés
1869: Le Mot de la fin by Clairville and Paul Siraudin, Théâtre des Variétés
1870: Le Ver rongeur by Jules Moinaux and Henry Bocage, Théâtre des Variétés
1873: Les Merveilleuses by Victorien Sardou, Théâtre des Variétés
1875: La Revue à la vapeur by Paul Siraudin, Henri Blondeau and Hector Monréal, Théâtre des Variétés
1875: Les Trois Épiciers by Joseph-Philippe Lockroy and Anicet Bourgeois, Théâtre des Variétés
1875: Les Bêtises d'hier by Clairville, Hippolyte Cogniard and Paul Siraudin, Théâtre des Variétés
1876: Le roi dort by Eugène Labiche and Alfred Delacour, Théâtre des Variétés

Sources 
 Angelo de Gubernatis : Dictionnaire international des écrivains du jour (page 339) 1888-1891

References

External links 
 Charles Blondelet sur lesArchivesduSpectacle.net

19th-century French male actors
French male stage actors
19th-century French dramatists and playwrights
French chansonniers
1820 births
Writers from Paris
1888 deaths